Alpha-(1,6)-fucosyltransferase is an enzyme that in humans is encoded by the FUT8 gene.

This enzyme belongs to the family of fucosyltransferases. The product of this gene catalyzes the transfer of fucose from GDP-fucose to N-linked type complex glycopeptides. This enzyme is distinct from other fucosyltransferases which catalyze alpha1-2, alpha1-3, and alpha1-4 fucose addition. The expression of this gene may contribute to the malignancy of cancer cells and to their invasive and metastatic capabilities. Alternatively spliced variants encoding different isoforms have been identified.

Kyowa Hakko Kirin's "Potelligent" platform uses a CHO cell line in which FUT8 has been knocked out to make afucosylated monoclonal antibodies.

References

Further reading

External links